In 2016, the United States had the highest prison and jail population (2,121,600 in adult facilities in 2016), and the highest incarceration rate in the world (655 per 100,000 people in 2016). According to the World Prison Population List (11th edition) there were around 10.35 million people in penal institutions worldwide in 2015. The US had 2,173,800 prisoners in adult facilities in 2015. That means the US held 21.0% of the world's prisoners in 2015, even though the US represented only around 4.4 percent of the world's population in 2015. By the end of 2020, the U.S. prison and jail population had decreased to 1,675,400, with an incarceration rate of 505 per 100,000 people. This left America with the second-largest prison population, behind China, and the sixth-highest incarceration rate.

Comparing English-speaking developed countries; the overall incarceration rate in the US is 639 per 100,000 population of all ages (as of 2018),  the incarceration rate of Canada is 104 per 100,000 (as of 2018), England and Wales is 130 per 100,000 (as of 2021), and Australia is 160 per 100,000 (as of 2020). Comparing other developed countries, the rate of Spain is 122 per 100,000 (as of 2020), France is 90 per 100,000 (as of 2020), Germany is 69 per 100,000 (as of 2020), Norway is 49 per 100,000 (as of 2020), Netherlands is 63 per 100,000 (as of 2018), and Japan is 38 per 100,000 (as of 2019).

Comparing other countries with similar percentages of immigrants, Germany has a rate of 78 per 100,000 (as of 2017), Italy is 96 per 100,000 (as of 2018), and Saudi Arabia is 197 per 100,000 (as of 2017). Comparing other countries with a zero tolerance policy for illegal drugs, the rate of Russia is 411 per 100,000 (as of 2018), Kazakhstan is 194 per 100,000 (as of 2018), Singapore is 201 per 100,000 (as of 2017), and Sweden is 57 per 100,000 (as of 2016).

The incarceration rate of the People's Republic of China varies depending on sources and measures. According to the World Prison Brief, the rate for only sentenced prisoners is 118 per 100,000 (as of 2015). The rate for prisoners including estimations for the number of pre-trial detainees and those in administrative detention is 164 per 100,000 (as of 2015). In a 2010 interview Harry Wu, a U.S.-based human rights activist and ex-Chinese labor camp prisoner, estimates that "in the last 60 years, more than 40–50 million people" were in Chinese labor camps, but that period includes the mass incarcerations of the 1950s or the Cultural Revolution (1966-1976) and is not representative of China in 2010.

U.S. incarceration rate peaked in 2008 

Total US incarceration (prisons and jails) peaked in 2008. On January 1, 2008 more than 1 in 100 adults in the United States were in prison or jail. Total correctional population (prison, jail, probation, parole) peaked in 2007. If all prisoners are counted (including juvenile, territorial, ICE, Indian country, and military), then in 2008 the USA had around 24.7% of the world's 9.8 million prisoners.

A 2008 article in The New York Times said that "it is the length of sentences that truly distinguishes American prison policy. Indeed, the mere number of sentences imposed here would not place the United States at the top of the incarceration lists. If lists were compiled based on annual admissions to prison per capita, several European countries would outpace the United States. But American prison stays are much longer, so the total incarceration rate is higher."

More comparisons 

In the United States, women make up more than one tenth of the whole prison population. In most countries, the proportion of female inmates to the larger population is closer to one in twenty. Australia is the exception where the rate of female imprisonment increased from 9.2 percent in 1991 to 15.3 percent in 1999.

In addition, the United States has significant racial disparities in rates of incarceration. According to Michelle Alexander in a 2010 book, the United States "imprisons a larger percentage of its black population than South Africa did at the height of apartheid". The black imprisonment rate of South Africa could not have come close to today’s American rate simply due to limited room. Notably, there’s something of an international theme in countries comparing themselves to apartheid South Africa. There were instances where Australian journalists were drawing the same contrast relative to rates of imprisonment in their country. In the Huffington Post piece "Mass Incarceration's Failure", attorney Antonio Moore states "The incarceration rate for young black men ages 20 to 39, is nearly 10,000 per 100,000. To give context, during the racial discrimination of apartheid in South Africa, the prison rate for black male South Africans, rose to 851 per 100,000."

A major contributor to the high incarceration rates is the length of the prison sentences in the United States. One of the criticisms of the United States system is that it has much longer sentences than any other part of the world. The typical mandatory sentence for a first-time drug offense in federal court is five or ten years, compared to other developed countries around the world where a first time offense would warrant at most 6 months in jail. Mandatory sentencing prohibits judges from using their discretion and forces them to place longer sentences on nonviolent offenses than they normally would do.

Even though there are other countries that have a higher rate of committing inmates to prison annually, the fact that the United States keeps their prisoners longer causes the total incarceration rate to become higher. To give an example, the average burglary sentence in the United States is 16 months, compared to 5 months in Canada and 7 months in England.

The US incarceration rate peaked in 2008 when about 1,000 in 100,000 U.S. adults were behind bars. That's 760 inmates per 100,000 U.S. residents of all ages. This incarceration rate was similar to the average incarceration levels in the Soviet Union during the existence of the infamous Gulag system, when the Soviet Union's population reached 168 million, and 1.2 to 1.5 million people were in the Gulag prison camps and colonies (i.e. about 714 to 892 imprisoned per 100,000 USSR residents, according to numbers from Anne Applebaum and Steven Rosefielde). Some of the latter Soviet Union's yearly incarceration rates from 1934 to 1953, however, likely were the world's historically highest for a modern age country. In The New Yorker article The Caging of America (2012), Adam Gopnik writes: "Over all, there are now more people under 'correctional supervision' in America—more than six million—than were in the Gulag under Stalin at its height."

Comparison to OECD countries 

OECD incarceration rate by country. Data is from World Prison Brief.

All but four US states (the exceptions are Rhode Island, Vermont, Massachusetts, and Minnesota) have a higher incarceration rate than Turkey, the nation with the second highest incarceration rate among OECD countries. See: List of U.S. states by incarceration and correctional supervision rate.

See also 

 List of U.S. states by incarceration rate
 Incarceration in the United States
 Youth incarceration in the United States
 War on Drugs

References 

Incarceration rates in the United States
Penal system in the United States